Armatophallus hackeri is a moth of the family Gelechiidae. It is found in Yemen and Ethiopia.

The forewings are light brown with the costal margin irregularly mottled with black, and with a small black spot near the base and a big spot at three-fourths, as well as a diffuse black pattern of irregular shape near the base. Two black dots are found in the middle of the wing, a small black dot in the corner of the cell, and a whitish diffuse spot at three-fourths on the costal margin. The hindwings are grey. Adults have been recorded on wing in mid-November and early May.

Etymology
The species is named in honour of Hermann Hacker, who collected the type series.

References

Moths described in 2015
Armatophallus